Daškoniai (formerly) is a village in Kėdainiai district municipality, in Kaunas County, in central Lithuania. According to the 2011 census, the village had a population of 13 people. It is located 4 km from Kėdainiai, 2 km from Sirutiškis by the Kruostas river. There is one of the main cemeteries of Kėdainiai in the area of Daškoniai village.

History
At the beginning of the 20th century, Daškoniai was an okolica.

Demography

Images

References

Villages in Kaunas County
Kėdainiai District Municipality